Sakura Nojima (born 25 April 1999) is a Japanese professional footballer who plays as a forward for WE League club Nojima Stella Kanagawa Sagamihara.

Club career 
Nojima made her WE League debut on 12 September 2021.

References 

Japanese women's footballers
1999 births
Living people
Women's association football forwards
People from Kadoma, Osaka
Association football people from Osaka Prefecture
Nojima Stella Kanagawa Sagamihara players
WE League players